The Sammamish (indigenously) people are a Coast Salish Native American tribe in the Sammamish River Valley in central King County, Washington.  Their name is variously translated as ssts'p-abc ("meander dwellers", a group residing around Bothell), s-tah-PAHBSH ("willow people") or as Samena ("hunter people"), which was corrupted into Sammamish. According to Hitchman, it does not mean "hunter people": the name is derived from samma, meaning "the sound of the blue crane" and mish, meaning "river."  The name may have originated with the Snoqualmie—some tribal members once lived along the lake near the bottom of Inglewood Hill—but this has not been verified. They were also known to early European-American settlers as "Squak", "Simump", and "Squowh." Squak is a corruption of sqwa'ux, meaning Issaquah Creek, which was a village site on Sammamish Lake . They were closely related to the Duwamish, and have often been considered a Duwamish sub-group as part of the Xacuabš ("People of the Large Lake") who lived near Lake Washington .  Like the Duwamish, the Sammamish originally spoke a southern dialect of Lushootseed .

The largest Sammamish village was tlah-WAH-dees at the mouth of the Sammamish River, which at the time was between present-day Kenmore and Bothell, east of its present location at the southwest corner of Kenmore. The mouth of the river moved to the west after 1916, when Lake Washington was lowered nine feet by the United States Army Corps of Engineers.  A second Sammamish village with at least one longhouse was located near what is now Issaquah.  When Europeans from the Hudson's Bay Company arrived in the area in 1832, the Sammamish had several permanent and seasonal settlements along the length of the river, and numbered as many as 200.

In 1855, the United States government signed the Treaty of Point Elliott with the putative leaders of most of the Puget Sound tribes, including Chief Seattle of the Duwamish.  The territorial governor moved to enforce the treaty by relocating the tribes named in the treaty, including the Sammamish.  Many of the Sammamish, including a leader known as Sah-wich-ol-gadhw, did not accept the validity of the treaty. Negotiations with Indian agent 'Doc' Maynard were unsuccessful, and in 1856 some of the Sammamish joined in the Battle of Seattle, a raid on the White settler population.  After this attack and the brief Puget Sound War, the Sammamish relocated from the river valley to reservations named in the treaty, or to non-reservation lands .  Local sawmill owner and real estate developer Henry Yesler, who had previously used local Indians as laborers, aided the removal and relocation .  As with the relocation of other Northwest natives, the occupation of lands and the relocation of people was probably significantly enabled by the 1862 Pacific Northwest smallpox epidemic, which may have killed as much as half of the remaining native population, as well as by the devastation from the effects of various previous epidemics.

After this relocation, descendants of the Sammamish dispersed into other tribes, including the Suquamish, Snoqualmie, and the people of the Tulalip Reservation, and are generally considered members of those tribes.

See also 
 Coast Salish peoples
 History of Seattle before 1900

Notes

Bibliography 
 
   Page links to Village Descriptions Duwamish-Seattle section "Village Descriptions Duwamish-Seattle".  Dailey referenced "Puget Sound Geography" by T. T. Waterman. Washington DC: National Anthropological Archives, mss. and "Indian Lake Washington" by David Buerge in the Seattle Weekly, Aug 1-Aug 7, 1984.  Recommended start is "Coast Salish Villages of Puget Sound" "Start Page".
 
 
 
 
 , referencing:
 Reed Ramsey, "Postmarked Washington, 1850–1960," Microfilm (Olympia: Washington State Library, February, 1966), 607-610
 David Buerge, "Indian Lake Washington," The Weekly, August 1, 1984, pp. 29–33
 Sarah Lopez Williams, "Small Places Hit By Growth Too," The Seattle Times, January 15, 1997, p. B-1
 Clayton Park, "Truly Site In Limbo Again As State Ponders College Site," Puget Sound Business Journal, February 26, 1993, p. 16
 Fred Klein, comp., Slough of Memories: Recollections of Life in Bothell, Kenmore, North Creek, Woodinville, 1920–1990 (Seattle: Peanut Butter Press, 1992)
 Amy Eunice Stickney, Lucille McDonald, Squak Slough, 1870–1920: Early Days on the Sammamish River, Woodinville-Bothell-Kenmore (Seattle: Friends of the Bothell Library, 1977)
 Clarence B. Bagley, History of King County (Chicago: S. J. Clarke, 1929), 856-861.

Indigenous peoples of the Pacific Northwest
Native American tribes in Washington (state)